The Agricultural Bank of China robbery was the embezzlement of nearly 51 million yuan ( US$6.7 million) from the Handan branch of the Agricultural Bank of China (ABC) in Hebei province between March 16 and April 14, 2007. Perpetrated by two vault managers employed at the branch, it is the largest bank robbery in China's history.

The idea for the heist had begun when one of the managers, Ren Xiaofeng, stole 200,000 yuan (c. US$26,000) in October 2006 with the complicity of two security guards, Zhao Xuenan and Zhang Qiang. Ren then purchased tickets for the Chinese lottery, with the intention of winning a sufficiently large prize that he could return the missing funds before their absence was noted, and still have money left over for himself. Despite the odds, Ren was successful, and he was able to return the 200,000 to the vault.

Emboldened by his initial success, Ren joined forces with another manager, Ma Xiangjing, to perpetrate the same crime on a far larger scale. During March and April 2007, the two stole 32.96 million yuan (c. US$4.3 million), and spent almost the entire amount—31.25 million—on lottery tickets. This time good fortune was not on their side. In desperation, they stole six cash boxes containing a further 18 million yuan (c. US$2.3 million) on April 14, spending 14 million in a single day in an effort to recover their losses. Despite Handan reporting record lottery ticket sales, the two recouped only 98,000 yuan (c. US$12,700).

On April 16, ABC branch managers discovered the missing money and notified the police. With insufficient funds to cover the losses, Ren and Ma used their meager winnings to buy fake IDs and flee. This prompted an extensive manhunt, with the Public Security Ministry placing the two men on their "Most Wanted" list. Ma was arrested in Beijing on April 18, and Ren was found a day later in Lianyungang, a coastal town in Jiangsu Province.

Ren and Ma were charged with embezzlement, while Zhao and Zhang, the security guards, were charged with misappropriating public funds. A fifth man, Song Changhai, was also prosecuted for sheltering a criminal, Ma, while he was on the run. The three accomplices were all given sentences of up to five years in prison, while the two managers were sentenced to death. A landlord, a cab driver, and a car saleswoman in Lianyungang shared a 200,000 yuan reward for assisting police to arrest Ren, while in Handan five employees of the bank were fired. Only 5.5 million yuan was ever recovered by the police, with the remainder squandered by the perpetrators' gambling.

Both Ren and Ma were executed in Hebei province on April 1, 2008. As criminals, their bodies were cremated and the ashes thrown into the Yellow Sea by the Chinese Police.

References

Agricultural Bank of China
Bank robberies
Crime in China
2007 crimes in China
Robberies in China